Alexandros Potamianos is an engineer at the National Technical University of Athens, Greece. He was named a Fellow of the Institute of Electrical and Electronics Engineers (IEEE) in 2016 for his contributions to human-centered speech and multimodal signal analysis.

References 

Fellow Members of the IEEE
Living people
Academic staff of the National Technical University of Athens
Greek computer scientists
Year of birth missing (living people)